A false start is a prohibited movement before play begins in sports.

False start may also refer to:

Music
 False Start (album), a 1970 album by Love
 False Start (band), a band from Auckland, New Zealand
 "False Start", a song by Bikini Kill from Reject All American

Other uses
 False Start (film), (Falscher Start), a 1919 German silent film directed by Georg Alexander
 TLS False Start, a security feature developed by Google
 False start, a speech disfluency
 False Start, a painting by Jasper Johns
 A False Start: London Poems 1959–1963, a collection of poems by Peter Russell published in 1993